The Bond on Brickell is a residential skyscraper at 1080 Brickell Avenue. The 1080 Brickell site is located near the Tenth Street Metromover station and the Brickell Metrorail station. 1080 Brickell is located behind the existing 1110 Brickell office building and actually has frontage at 1198 Southeast 1st Avenue, not on Brickell Avenue. The project broke ground on January 28, 2014.

Older proposals

The original 1080 Brickell was planned to be built by 2010. It was planned to rise  and consist of 43 floors of residential condominiums, containing 315 units, a swimming pool, jacuzzi, fitness center, and a spa. It was put on hold due to the bad economy. In March 2011, the developer announced that with the reviving market that they were looking to start 1080 Brickell in 2011 for a 2014 completion date. However, the site was still being used as a parking lot for 1110 Brickell in early 2012 and was essentially cancelled.

See also
 Brickell Avenue
 List of tallest buildings in Miami

References

External links
 Emporis.com
 http://1080brickellavenue.com/1080Brickell.pdf

Residential skyscrapers in Miami
2017 establishments in Florida
Residential buildings completed in 2017
Residential condominiums in Miami